Pride of Baghdad is a graphic novel written by Brian K. Vaughan and illustrated by Niko Henrichon released by DC Comics' Vertigo imprint on September 13, 2006. The story is a fictionalized account of the true story of four lions that escaped from the Baghdad Zoo after an American bombing in 2003. The book won the IGN award for best original graphic novel in 2006.

Plot 
The story revolves around the brief freedom experienced by a small pride of captive lions, who escape from Baghdad Zoo during the 2003 invasion of Baghdad by the U.S.-led coalition. As the lions roam the streets of Baghdad trying to survive, each lion comes to embody a different viewpoint regarding the Iraq War.

Production 
Speaking on the decision to publish Pride of Baghdad as a single volume rather than the more common serial form, Vaughan stated "I wanted readers to experience the suddenness with which these animals' lives were changed and that worked much better in a story that can be read in one sitting...the learning curve for writing a 136-page self-contained novel was steep, but I'm thrilled with how it turned out".

Characters

Main characters 
Zill, the alpha male (and only adult male) of the pride. Though usually mild-mannered, he begins to show signs of aggression and proves to be a competent fighter.
Safa, an old lioness who is blind in one eye and has a torn ear. She has become accustomed to captivity and views the human advantage of their new freedom. It is implied that she once used to be Zill's mate.
Noor, a younger lioness, mother to Ali, and Zill's current mate. She longs for freedom from the zoo. She and Safa rarely agree, and they often fight verbally.
Ali, Noor's young cub.

Secondary characters 
Bukk, a lion from Safa's past. He is the one who blinded her and mutilated her ear after she clawed him and proceeded to rape her before allowing his brothers to do the same.
Bukk's brothers, Bukk's brothers appear in Safa's memory about her past. They took turns raping her after Bukk did so.
 An unnamed sea turtle who speaks with Safa and Ali about Gulf War.
Fajer, a blood-thirsty bear who challenges the group. He eats most of the meals intended for Rashid, leading to the latter dying of starvation. He is first encountered by Safa and Noor, who attempt to bring him down; their failed attack results in him clawing out Safa's only good eye, rendering her fully blind. Before he can move in to kill a wounded Noor, Zill appears and challenges him. Fajer initially has the upper hand, but Zill gouges his nose before tackling him through a wall and onto the street below. Seriously injured, Fajer continues to mock the lions' nature, at which point Zill signals Ali to scare a group of horses into a stampede which crushes Fajer multiple times. Near death and in tremendous pain, Fajer begs the lions to kill him, which Zill refuses, believing a quick death is too good for him. They leave him to die slowly in agony.
Rashid, a tortured pet lion on the verge of death. He passes away due to starvation as Fajer ate all of the meals intended for him. Seeing him in such a horrible condition results in an argument between Safa and Noor. Noor claims that humans did this to him, but Safa retorts by saying that while humans kept them captive, they were not torturers. Noor responds by saying that no matter what, those that would hold them captive are always tyrants and that if they had remained in captivity, sooner or later they would've wound up like Rashid. At this point, Fajer enters, violently claiming that Rashid was a spoiled pet that lived as comfortably as the lions ever did at the zoo. While never stated in the story, it is likely that Rashid belonged to Saddam Hussein's son Uday, who was known for keeping lions as pets.

Reception 

IGN named Pride of Baghdad the Best Original Graphic Novel of 2006, calling it a "modern classic", and commenting that the book "can be enjoyed on several levels. Those wanting a 'simple' tale of survival and family will find that. Those wanting a powerful, gripping analogy of war will find that as well. Writer Brian K. Vaughan was also careful to avoid pinpointing any one particular viewpoint—each lion represents a different attitude, which is refreshing since many books do not allow that choice. Featuring stunning artwork by Niko Henrichon, there is no way any comic book reader should pass up this graphic novel". Dorkgasm described it as "one of the most poignant anthropomorphic stories since Animal Farm". The book was listed in the ALA's Great Graphic Novels for Teens Top Ten in 2007 and Booklist Editors’ Choice: Adult Books for Young Adults.

See also 
 Babylon's Ark
 Bengal Tiger at the Baghdad Zoo
 Iraqi lion
 Lions in literature

References

External links 
 Official MySpace page for Pride of Baghdad
 A visual step-by-step from Niko Henrichon, the book's artist 
 Brian K. Vaughan's Roaring Pride, Publishers Weekly, June 20, 2006.
 BBC News US troops kill Baghdad lions
 "CNN" Baghdad Zoo: A different battle
 The Joy of Pride: Vaughan Talks Pride of Baghdad , Comic Book Resources

2006 books
2006 comics debuts
Books about lions
Books about the 2003 invasion of Iraq
Comics by Brian K. Vaughan
Comics set during the Iraq War
Vertigo Comics graphic novels
Post-apocalyptic comics
Harvey Award winners for Best Graphic Album of Original Work